Hatüey Bacardi Club is a professional football club based in Port-au-Prince, Haiti.
The last known time the club played in Division 1 was in 1970. After the 2010–11 season, the club was relegated to Division 3.

History
The Hatüey Bacardi Club was founded in Morne à Tuf, Port-au-Prince on 13 July 1935.

Honours
Ligue Haïtienne: 2
 1940, 1945

References

Football clubs in Haiti
Ouest (department)